Eupithecia biumbrata is a moth in the  family Geometridae. It is found in Peru.

References

Moths described in 1907
biumbrata
Moths of South America